Meghana Lokesh is an Indian actress. She predominantly appears in Telugu and Kannada television series, and became known for the serial Sasirekha Parinayam (2013 - 2016) as Sasi B.Tech which premiered on the Star Maa channel.

 she portrays the double roles of Manga and Nithya in the Zee Telugu television series Kalyana Vaibhogam and the role of Tulasi in Zee Telugu's Raktha Sambandham.

Early life and career 
Meghana Lokesh was born in Mysore, Karnataka. Her father is an engineer and her mother is a Kannada lecturer. She has a brother who is also an engineer.  Meghana has been associated with theatre from very young age. She started her theatre at the age of 8 and performed nearly 270 shows till her degree and Mandya Ramesh was her theatre guru. She started her Television career with supporting role in Kannada television soap opera Devi, which aired on Zee Kannada. Meghana's first lead role was in Kannada Television Series Pavitra Bandhana, where she played the role of Pavitra. Following this, She also worked in other Kannada TV Series named Purushottama, which aired on Zee Kannada.

Her big breakthrough was with the Telugu hit series Sasirekha Parinayam which screened on Star Maa from 2013 to 2016. She also acted in the feature film Idhi Ma Prema Katha  opposite Anchor Ravi, which received mixed reviews.

In 2017, she acted in two message-oriented Telugu short films named Emotion and Beautiful Life. Later that year, Meghana started a new Zee Telugu series Kalyana Vaibhogam in which she is portraying the dual role of Manga and Nithya. In, 2018 She featured in a film called Ameerpet 2 America.   Around the time, She was signed to play a lead role in her third Telugu Soap Opera titled, Raktha Sambandham.

Filmography

Television

Film

References

External links 
 

Kannada actresses
Indian film actresses
21st-century Indian actresses
Actresses in Kannada television
Living people
Actresses in Telugu cinema
Indian television actresses
Actresses in Telugu television
Year of birth missing (living people)